The following is a list of scholarly journals in economics containing most of the prominent academic journals in economics.

Popular magazines or other publications related to economics, finance, or business are not listed.

A

Affilia
African Journal of Economic Policy
American Economic Journal
American Economic Review
American Journal of Agricultural Economics
Annual Review of Economics
Applied Econometrics and International Development
Applied Economic Perspectives and Policy
Asian Economic Papers

B

Brookings Papers on Economic Activity
Business Economics

C

Cambridge Journal of Economics
Canadian Journal of Economics
Carnegie-Rochester Conference Series on Public Policy
Computational Economics
Contemporary Economic Policy

D

D+C Development and Cooperation

E

Eastern Economic Journal
Econ Journal Watch
Econometric Theory
Econometrica
Econometrics Journal
Economic and Industrial Democracy
Economic Development and Cultural Change
Economic Geography
Economic History Review
Economic Inquiry
The Economic Journal
Economic Modelling
Economic Policy
Economic Theory
Economica
Economics and Human Biology
Economics Bulletin
Economics Letters
Economics of Governance
Economics & Sociology
De Economist
Education Finance and Policy
Energy Economics
Essays in Economic & Business History
European Economic Review
European Journal of Health Economics
European Journal of Political Economy
Explorations in Economic History

F

Feminist Economics
Fiscal Studies

G

Games and Economic Behavior
German Economic Review

H 
Health Economics

I

Industrial and Labor Relations Review
Intereconomics
International Economic Review
International Journal of Central Banking
International Review of Economics & Finance
Investment Analysts Journal

J

Japanese Economic Review
Journal of Applied Econometrics
Journal of Banking and Finance
Journal of Behavioral Finance
Journal of Business and Economic Statistics
Journal of Common Market Studies
Journal of Comparative Economics
Journal of Competition Law and Economics
Journal of Cultural Economics
Journal of Development Economics
Journal of Econometrics
Journal of Economic Behavior and Organization
Journal of Economic Dynamics and Control
Journal of Economic Education
Journal of Economic History
Journal of Economic Issues
Journal of Economic Literature
Journal of Economic Perspectives
Journal of Economic Theory
Journal of Economics & Management Strategy
Journal of Emerging Market Finance
Journal of Entrepreneurship and Innovation in Emerging Economies
Journal of Environmental Economics and Management
Journal of the European Economic Association
Journal of Finance
Journal of Financial and Quantitative Analysis
Journal of Financial Economics
Journal of Financial Studies
Journal of Health Economics
Journal of Human Capital
Journal of International Economics
Journal of International Money and Finance
Journal of Labor Economics
Journal of Law and Economics
The Journal of Law, Economics, & Organization
Journal of Macroeconomics
Journal of Mathematical Economics
Journal of Monetary Economics
Journal of Money, Credit and Banking
Journal of Policy Modeling
Journal of Political Economy
Journal of Public Economics
Journal of Regional Science
Journal of Sports Economics
Journal of Wine Economics

L

Land Economics

M

Macroeconomic Dynamics
Manchester School
Marine Resource Economics
Mathematical Social Sciences

N

National Institute Economic Review
New Political Economy

O

ORDO – Jahrbuch für die Ordnung von Wirtschaft und Gesellschaft (The Ordo Yearbook of Economic and Social Order)
Oxford Review of Economic Policy

P

Post-Communist Economies
Public Choice

Q

Quarterly Journal of Austrian Economics
Quarterly Journal of Economics

R

RAND Journal of Economics
Real-world economics review
Research in Economics
Rethinking Marxism
Review of Agricultural Economics
Review of Austrian Economics
Review of Economic Design
Review of Economic Dynamics
Review of Economic Studies
Review of Economics and Statistics
Review of Environmental Economics and Policy
Review of International Organizations
Review of International Political Economy
Review of Keynesian Economics
Review of Radical Political Economics

S

Scandinavian Journal of Economics
Science and Society
Scottish Journal of Political Economy
Series of Unsurprising Results in Economics
Singapore Economic Review
Small Business Economics
Socio-Economic Review
South African Journal of Economic History
South African Journal of Economics
Southern Economic Journal
South Asian Journal of Macroeconomics and Public Finance

W

Wirtschaftsdienst

See also 

 List of environmental economics journals
 List of open access journals
 List of scholarly journals in international business
 List of scientific journals

External links 
Economics journal impact rankings at IDEAS/RePEc
 PDF
 PDF

 
Journals
Economics